Hemmatabad-e Chah-e Malek (also Romanized as Hemmatābād-e Chāh Malek; also known as Hemmatābād-e Mashā) is a village in Rigan Rural District, in the Central District of Rigan County, Kerman Province, Iran. At the 2006 census, its population was 196, in 44 families.

References 

Populated places in Rigan County